Mark Hunter Klein (born December 22, 1993, in Central City, Louisiana, United States) is an American blue-eyed soul and blues singer-songwriter, actor and member of The Boogie Kings, an American swamp pop band.

Biography
Klein began singing at the age of two. However, he is most notable for becoming the youngest member of the legendary 1950s supergroup, The Boogie Kings at the age of 10
Ned Theall, a Cajun trumpeter and member of The Boogie Kings became his mentor after Klein e-mailed him and became a member of the band. Klein is a multi-instrumentalist; playing guitar, mandolin, keyboards, drums, and Bass guitar.

Klein recorded "Sick and Tired " on The Boogie Kings' 2007 album, Never Go Away. Klein, Louisiana Hall of Famer Allen Wayne and Gregg Martinez were dubbed "The New Breed" by the current members of The Boogie Kings after becoming members in 2005.

Before he joined The Boogie Kings Klein recorded his first album, It's Just Me when he was 10 in 2004 and his second album, Blue Eyed Soul Patrol in 2006. When he was 6, he became a member of Louisiana Kids, an organization based in Louisiana for child singers and performers. At the age of seven, he became a member of Thunder-n-Lightnin, a duo consisting of Klein and Kayla Woodson, his singing partner. However, the group disbanded two years later.

Throughout his career, he has performed at bowl games, oprys, beauty pageants, larger festivals, nursing homes among other venues.  He also works at Alexandria, LA NBC affiliate KALB as a promotions manager, host of local program "Down Home Louisiana," and has composed news themes for said station.

Klein cites his influences such as Elvis Presley, Wilson Pickett, and Ray Charles, among others. Klein is currently recording a third album, with songs Klein has mostly written himself. Released, will be the singles "The Kid Is Hot Tonight!" and "I've Done Everything For You".

Discography

Albums

Unreleased songs
"I Want to Thank You"
"New Orleans Medley"
"I Think I'm in Love"
"I Wanna Rock You"

Singles with The Boogie Kings
"Sick and Tired" on the album Never Go Away

Solo singles
"The Kid Is Hot Tonight!", 2008
"I've Done Everything for You", 2008

References

External links
Official website
Official website of The Boogie Kings
Mark Klein at BoySoloist.com

1993 births
American rock musicians
American rock guitarists
American male bass guitarists
American mandolinists
American multi-instrumentalists
The Boogie Kings members
American soul musicians
American child singers
American blues singers
American rock songwriters
American rock singers
American male child actors
21st-century American singers
Singer-songwriters from Louisiana
Living people
American keyboardists
American male singer-songwriters
People from Central, Louisiana
American rhythm and blues singers
21st-century American bass guitarists
Guitarists from Louisiana
21st-century American drummers
21st-century American male singers